The Southwest Museum of the American Indian is a museum, library, and archive located in the Mt. Washington neighborhood of Los Angeles, California, above the north-western bank of the Arroyo Seco (Los Angeles County) canyon and stream. The museum is owned by the Autry Museum of the American West.  Its collections deal mainly with Native Americans. It also has an extensive collection of pre-Hispanic, Spanish colonial, Latino, and Western American art and artifacts.

Major collections had included American Indians of the Great Plains, American Indians of California, and American Indians of the Northwest Coast. Most of those materials were moved off-site, but the Southwest Museum has maintained an ongoing public exhibition on Pueblo pottery, open free of charge.

The Metro L Line stops down the hill from the museum at the Southwest Museum station. About a block from the L Line stop is an entrance on Museum Drive that opens to a long tunnel formerly filled with dioramas, since removed by the Autry Museum and placed in storage. At the end of the tunnel is an elevator to the museum's lower lobby.

History
Charles Fletcher Lummis, an anthropologist, historian, journalist, and photographer, created the Southwest Society, which was the western branch of the Archaeological Institute of America. He gained the support of city leaders, and with the financial backing of attorney Joseph Scott, opened the Southwest Museum in 1907. The museum moved from Downtown Los Angeles to Mt. Washington in 1914.

The 1914 building was designed by architects Sumner P. Hunt and Silas Reese Burns. Later additions to the museum include the Caroline Boeing Poole Wing of Basketry (completed 1941), by architect Gordon B. Kaufmann, and the Braun Research Library (1971), by architect Glen E. Cook.

Frederick Russell Burnham, the highly decorated military scout and father of the international scouting movement, was an early president.

In 2003 the financially teetering museum was absorbed by the Autry Museum which designated it as its Mt. Washington Campus.

Following years of controversy with the Friends of the Southwest Museum and other local community organizations, the Autry began a partnership with the National Trust for Historic Preservation and the City of Los Angeles  to develop a long-term plan for the site. On January 22, 2015, the Southwest Museum was designated a National Treasure by the National Trust for Historic Preservation. In March 2019 the Autry and the National Trust published a Request for Interest for the revitalization and reuse of the historic Southwest Museum campus and Casa de Adobe.

Collection
One gallery is open to the public on Saturdays from 10 a.m. to 4 p.m., with events and exhibitions that may take place on other parts of the campus.  Admission is free. Autry has moved and been conserving most of the original collection in a new state-of-the-art home in Burbank, with plans to open that in 2021.

See also
 List of Registered Historic Places in Los Angeles
 Bertha Parker Pallan
 Mark Raymond Harrington
 Cheech and Chong

References

External links

Autry Museum of the American West - official website
Southwest Museum (Mt. Washington Campus) - official website
Friends of the Southwest Museum Coalition - supporters' website
Treasureswm.org: Treasure It Together: Southwest Museum Site − website homepage — project of the National Register of Historic Places.
Image of two Indigenous protesters talking to Dr. Carl Dentzel, director of Southwest Museum about display in Los Angeles, California, 1970. Los Angeles Times Photographic Archive (Collection 1429). UCLA Library Special Collections, Charles E. Young Research Library, University of California, Los Angeles.

Museums in Los Angeles
Native American museums in California
History museums in California
Arroyo Seco (Los Angeles County)
Mount Washington, Los Angeles
Los Angeles Historic-Cultural Monuments
Buildings and structures on the National Register of Historic Places in Los Angeles
Native American history of California
Museums established in 1907
1907 establishments in California
1900s architecture in the United States
Sumner Hunt buildings
Mediterranean Revival architecture in California
Native Americans in Los Angeles